The Hyde Park Herald is a weekly newspaper that serves the Hyde Park neighborhood of Chicago, Illinois.

Overview 

The newspaper was founded in 1882.  For the Herald'''s first seven years, it was a suburban newspaper covering affairs in an independent unit of local government; after Hyde Park was annexed by Chicago in 1889, the Herald evolved into its current status as an urban neighborhood newspaper.

The Herald covers local business, retail, politics, real estate and housing, the University of Chicago, sports, K–12 education and local Chicago Public Schools, parks (including the Barack Obama Presidential Center), crime, obituaries and fire. Freelancers provide photography and arts coverage. 

 Key people 

The longtime owner of the Hyde Park Herald remains Bruce Sagan. He is father of Paul Sagan, the former CEO of Akamai Technologies. In July 2018, Sagan named Randall Weissman the new publisher.

Future Washington Post columnist David Broder wrote for the Herald'' while working toward his master's degree from 1947 to 1951. Lee Botts, a prominent Great Lakes environmentalist and a senior official in the administration of President Jimmy Carter, was editor of the Herald in the late 1960s.  Democratic political consultant David Axelrod wrote for the paper while a student at the University of Chicago in the 1970s. Beauty Turner, a housing activist, was one of the paper's columnists.

References

External links 
 
 Archive of past issues (since 1882)

Publications established in 1882
Newspapers published in Chicago
1882 establishments in Illinois